Hsieh Shen-shan (born 10 February 1939) is a Taiwanese politician.

Political career
Hsieh served in the Legislative Yuan from 1973 to 1990 as a representative of laborers, then remained in the legislature until 1994, representing Hualien County. Hsieh left the legislature when he was chosen to head the Council of Labor Affairs. He stepped down from that position to run for Taipei County Magistrate in 1997. Hsieh lost to Su Tseng-chang and was named the secretary-general of the Executive Yuan the next year, before stepping down in 2000 upon the election of Chen Shui-bian. He came out of retirement in 2003 to run for the office of Hualien County magistrate after Chang Fu-hsing had died in office. The Kuomintang nominated Hsieh over many other KMT-affiliated candidates, including Chang's widow Liu Chao-a, and former magistrate Wu Kuo-tung. Listed second on the ballot, Hsieh finished first in the by-election with 73,710 votes. He was reelected in 2005 and stepped down at the end of his term in 2009.

References

1939 births
Living people
Kuomintang Members of the Legislative Yuan in Taiwan
Members of the 1st Legislative Yuan in Taiwan
Magistrates of Hualien County
Members of the 2nd Legislative Yuan
Taiwanese Ministers of Labor
Party List Members of the Legislative Yuan